Peggy Clarke (née Wood) (29 October 1937 – 15 September 2018) was joint British ladies' chess champion in 1966. She was the daughter of Baruch Harold Wood and married Peter Hugh Clarke in 1962. They had three daughters.

References

British female chess players
1937 births
2018 deaths